Hilario Manzano (1886 – death date unknown) was a Cuban first baseman in the Negro leagues in the 1910s.

A native of Havana, Cuba, Manzano played for the Cuban Stars (East) in 1918. In ten recorded games, he posted eight hits and four RBI in 41 plate appearances.

References

External links
Baseball statistics and player information from Baseball-Reference Black Baseball Stats and Seamheads

1886 births
Date of birth missing
Year of death missing
Place of death missing
Cuban Stars (East) players
Cuban expatriate baseball players in the United States